The 1928 Missouri gubernatorial election was held on November 6, 1928 and resulted in a victory for the Republican nominee, former Congressman Henry S. Caulfield, over the Democratic nominee, Francis M. Wilson, and several other candidates representing minor parties. Caulfield defeated lieutenant governor Philip Allen Bennett for the Republican nomination.

, this marks the last time the city of St. Louis voted Republican in a gubernatorial election.

Results

References

Missouri
1928
Gubernatorial
November 1928 events in the United States